The Dream Master is a science-fiction novel by Roger Zelazny.

Dream Master or The Dream Master may also refer to:

 Dream Master (album), by American recording artist Billie Hughes
 A Nightmare on Elm Street 4: The Dream Master, a 1988 American film
 Little Nemo: The Dream Master, a platform game
 The Dream Master (comics), a fictional character
 The Dream Master (German novel), a 1990 science fiction novel
 The Dream Master, the first book in a book series of the same name by Theresa Breslin